Scurtu may refer to several entities in Romania:

Scurtu, a tributary of the Răstolița in Mureș County
Scurtu Mare, a commune in Teleorman County
Scurtu, a village in Berlești Commune, Gorj County